Sarwar Jan Chowdhury is a Jatiya Party (Ershad) Bangladeshi politician and the former Member of Parliament of Gopalganj-2.

Career
Chowdhury was elected to parliament from Gopalganj-2 as a Jatiya Party candidate in 1986.

References

Bangladeshi politicians
Jatiya Party politicians
Living people
3rd Jatiya Sangsad members
Year of birth missing (living people)